Dick Ket (October 10, 1902 – September 15, 1940) was a Dutch magic realist painter noted for his still lifes and  self-portraits.

Biography
Born in Den Helder, Ket spent his childhood in Hoorn and then Ede before attending the Kunstoefening in Arnhem from 1922 to 1925. Born with a serious heart defect (believed to be tetralogy of Fallot with dextrocardia), he was prevented from traveling by debilitating weakness as well as by phobias, and lived secluded in his parents' house in Bennekom after 1930. Exposed to modern art mainly through reproductions, he concentrated on painting still lifes and self-portraits. His health worsened in his last decade, leading to his early death in Bennekom in 1940.

Works
While Ket's earliest paintings are impressionistic in style, he was influenced decisively by the art of the Neue Sachlichkeit in 1929, and thereafter painted in a magic realist style.

His meticulously composed and rendered still lifes feature favorite objects such as bottles, an empty bowl, eggs, and musical instruments. Ket juxtaposed these objects in angular arrangements, seen from a high vantage point, their cast shadows creating emphatic diagonals. These compositions reveal the influence of cubism as filtered through the posters of Cassandre, which are frequently depicted in Ket’s paintings. Another source of inspiration came from early Netherlandish painting, which Ket admired for its atmosphere of austere reverence that he called its quality of "intrusiveness".

Ket completed approximately 140 paintings, including forty self-portraits. As a result of his technical experimentation with different formulations and additives to the glaze medium, some of his paintings are not completely dry after six decades. In his self-portraits the progressive symptoms of his physical deterioration, such as cyanosis and finger clubbing, are apparent.

Museums holding works by Dick Ket include the Rijksmuseum in Amsterdam, the Museum Arnhem,  and the Museum Boijmans Van Beuningen in Rotterdam.

References

Further reading
Lock, S., Last, J. M., & Dunea, G. (2001). The Oxford illustrated companion to medicine. Oxford: Oxford University Press. 
Schmied, Wieland (1978). Neue Sachlichkeit and German Realism of the Twenties. London: Arts Council of Great Britain.

External links

 Biographical sketch

1902 births
1940 deaths
People from Den Helder
20th-century Dutch painters
Dutch male painters
20th-century Dutch male artists